Alice of Bigorre (1217/1220-1255), also known as Alice or Alix de Monfort was suo jure ruling Countess of Bigorre between 1251 and 
1255. 

She was the eldest daughter of Petronilla, Countess of Bigorre and her third husband Guy de Monfort. Alice was married twice during her lifetime and from her first marriage, she gained the title of Lady of Chabanais.

Life

Alice was born sometime between 1217 and 1220. She was the eldest child of her mother, she had one full sister also named Petronilla, who went on to marry Raoul de la Roche-Tesson. Her mother was married five times, her elder two daughters were the product of her third marriage. A fifth marriage to Boson of Mastas, Seigneur de Cognac, produced a half-sister named Martha, who married Gaston VII, Viscount of Béarn. Alice was cared for by her uncle, Amaury de Montfort, while he had her mother remarried. By the time of Petronilla's fifth marriage and the birth of her daughter Martha, she needed a stronger union so had Alice married off to Jordan, Lord of Chabanais, a relative of Boson of Mastas. An agreement was reached, upon Petronilla's death, Alice and Jordan would inherit Bigorre, whilst Martha would inherit her father's lands of Mastas. By 1247, Jordan had died and so Alice was left with their three children. She married for a second time to Raoul de Courtenay during 1247. The couple had a daughter named Matilda who later married Philip of Chieti.

Reign

In 1251, Petronilla died. However, she had passed control of the government over to Simon de Montfort, 6th Earl of Leicester, Alice's uncle. De Montfort had interpreted this act as a gift, so refused to hand Bigorre over to Alice on the death of her mother. Alice and her husband appealed to her half-sister Martha and her husband Gaston VII, Viscount of Béarn to help re-claim Bigorre, they accepted. To prevent Guyenne and Gascony from rebelling, Henry III of England recalled Simon de Montfort and appointed John Grailly in his place. However, Alice and her family re-claimed Bigorre during 1251. Alice reigned only for the next four years, dying in 1255. She was succeeded by her eldest son. However, following Alice's death, De Montfort did attempt to challenge her son for control of Bigorre once again. Upon Eskivat's death, control of Bigorre was disputed between Alice's sister Martha and her daughter Laura, with the latter eventually succeeding.

Issue
The marriage between Alice and Jordan produced three children:
Eskivat (died 1283), succeeded his mother, married Mascarós II d'Armagnac, Countess of Armagnac and Fézensac  but had no children.
Jordan (died before 1283) named as heir to his brother but predeceased him 
Laura (c.1240-1316), fought with her aunt Martha for control of Bigorre on the death of her brother. Married firstly to Simon of Rochechouart, lord of Availles, and secondly to Viscount Raymond V of Turenne. Laura had three children, all by her first marriage.

References

Contains translations from French Wikipedia

1255 deaths
Counts of Bigorre
Countesses
Year of birth unknown
Year of birth uncertain
13th-century women rulers
13th-century French people
13th-century French women